The Bagley–Cater Building, at 15 E. Tenth St. in Anniston, Alabama, is a Classical Revival-style commercial building built in 1908.  It was listed on the National Register of Historic Places in 1985.

It was deemed "significant as a well-developed local example of early 20th-century neoclassical commercial architecture. Distinguishing features of the building include the composition of Ionic pilasters and end pavilions with quoining and the fully detailed entablature embellished with swags."

Through 1985 the building had always served as a furniture store: as the Bagley Furniture and Undertaking Company until 1917, as the George
Cater Furniture Company, and then as the Rhodes Furniture Company.

References

External links

		
National Register of Historic Places in Calhoun County, Alabama
Neoclassical architecture in Alabama
Commercial buildings completed in 1908